State Highway 279 (SH 279) is a Texas state highway that runs from Cross Plains south to Brownwood.  The route was designated on October 25, 1938 from Brownwood north to the Lake Brownwood State Park, and was extended north to Cross Plains on August 23, 1945. On September 26, 1945, the section of SH 279 in Lake Brownwood state park was cancelled, and SH 279 was rerouted more directly from Brownwood to Cross Plains, replacing FM 602.

Junction list

References

279
Transportation in Brown County, Texas
Transportation in Callahan County, Texas